The 2001 Cheltenham and Gloucester Trophy was an English limited overs county cricket tournament which was held between 1 May and 1 September 2001.  It was the first Cheltenham & Gloucester Trophy following its change of name from the NatWest Trophy, with new sponsors Cheltenham & Gloucester plc.  The tournament was won by Somerset who defeated Leicesterhire by 41 runs in the final at Lord's.

Format
The 18 first-class counties, were joined by all twenty Minor Counties, plus Huntingdonshire.  They were also joined by the cricket boards of Derbyshire, Durham, Essex, Gloucestershire, Hampshire, Kent, Lancashire, Leicestershire, Middlesex, Northamptonshire, Nottinghamshire, Somerset, Surrey, Sussex, Warwickshire, Worcestershire and Yorkshire.  Unlike previous years, the national teams of Denmark, Ireland, the Netherlands and Scotland were unable to take part due to international commitments in the 2001 ICC Trophy.

The tournament was a knockout with four rounds before the quarter-final and semi-final stages. The winners of the semi-finals went on to the final at Lord's which was held on 1 September 2001.

First round

Second round

Third round

Fourth round

Quarter-finals

Semi-finals

Final

References

External links
CricketArchive tournament page 

Friends Provident Trophy seasons
Cheltenham andAmp Gloucester Trophy, 2001